Lockport Station may refer to:

 Lockport station (Illinois), a station on Metra's Heritage Corridor in Lockport, Illinois
 Union Station (Lockport, New York), a historic train station located at Lockport in Niagara County, New York
 Lockport Air Force Station, a closed US Air Force radar station near Shawnee, New York

See also 
 Lockport (disambiguation)